The Australian Catholic Students Association or ACSA is the peak body for Catholic students in Australia. The body was founded in 1942 as the University Catholic Federation Australia (UCFA), and has been renamed several times. In 1974 it became known as the Tertiary Catholic Federation Australia (TCFA) and in 1990 it was renamed the International Movement of Catholic Students Australia (IMCSA). The body has been known as the Australian Catholic Students Association since 2001.

ACSA is made up of Catholic tertiary students predominantly from the eastern states of Australia. ACSA affiliated societies have a presence in many universities, including Macquarie University, the University of Sydney, the University of New South Wales, the University of Melbourne, Monash University, and the Australian National University. It is officially supported by the Australian Catholic Bishops' Conference.

The current National President as of August 2022 is Harvey Inamac. The current patrons of the organisation are Professor Tracey Rowland, head of the Australian John Paul II Institute for Marriage and Family, and George Cardinal Pell.

Conferences

ACSA hosts an annual conference. This conference involves a series of theological and philosophical talks, a celebration of the Mass, and the Mannix Ball. The Ball is named in honour of Daniel Mannix, a former Archbishop of Melbourne.

External links

References

Students' unions in Australia